Rafik Haj Yahia (3 September 1949 – 16 April 2000) was an Israeli Arab politician who served as a member of the Knesset for the Labor Party and One Nation between March 1998 and June 1999.

Biography
Born in Tayibe, Haj Yahia gained a BA in Hebrew language and education from Bar-Ilan University, before training to be a teacher at a Haifa seminary. From 1971 until 1980 he worked as a teacher in an agricultural high school in his hometown. In 1981 he began working as a television reporter, a job he held until 1988. He became a member of Tayibe's local council, and became the town's first mayor in 1989. He also served as deputy head of the National Committee of Arab Local Authorities and of the Union of Local Authorities in Israel.

Although he missed out on a seat in the 1996 elections after winning a place on the party's list, Haj Yahia entered the Knesset on 28 March 1998 as a replacement for Moshe Shahal. Upon taking his seat, he resigned his position as mayor of Tayibe. On 25 March 1999, Yahia, Amir Peretz and Adisu Massala broke away from the Labor Party to form One Nation. He lost his seat in the 1999 elections and died the following year at the age of 50.

References

External links
 

1949 births
2000 deaths
Place of death missing
20th-century Israeli educators
Bar-Ilan University alumni
Arab members of the Knesset
Israeli Arab journalists
Israeli Labor Party politicians
Israeli television journalists
Mayors of places in Israel
Members of the 14th Knesset (1996–1999)
One Nation (Israel) politicians
People from Tayibe